The Proto-Indo-European homeland (or Indo-European homeland) was the prehistoric linguistic homeland of the Proto-Indo-European language (PIE). From this region, its speakers migrated east and west, and went on to form the proto-communities of the different branches of the Indo-European language family.

The most widely accepted proposal about the location of the Proto-Indo-European homeland is the steppe hypothesis, which puts the archaic, early and late PIE homeland in the Pontic–Caspian steppe around 4,000 BCE. The leading competitor is the Anatolian hypothesis, which puts it in Anatolia around 8,000 BCE. A notable third possibility, which has gained renewed attraction due to recent aDNA research, is the Armenian hypothesis which situates the homeland for archaic PIE south of the Caucasus. Several other explanations have been proposed, including the outdated but historically prominent North European hypothesis, the Neolithic creolisation hypothesis, the Paleolithic continuity paradigm, the Arctic theory, and the "indigenous Aryans" (or "out of India") hypothesis. These are not widely accepted, and are considered to be fringe theories.

The search for the homeland of the Indo-Europeans began in the late 18th century with the rediscovery of the Indo-European language family. The methods used to establish the homeland have been drawn from the disciplines of historical linguistics, archaeology, physical anthropology and, more recently, human population genetics.

Hypotheses

Main theories 
The steppe model, the Anatolian model, and the Near Eastern (or Armenian) model, are the three leading solutions for the Indo-European homeland. The steppe model, placing the Proto-Indo-European (PIE) homeland in the Pontic-Caspian steppe around 4,000 BCE, is the theory supported by most scholars.

According to linguist Allan R. Bomhard (2019), the steppe hypothesis proposed by archeologists Marija Gimbutas and David W. Anthony "is supported not only by linguistic evidence, but also by a growing body of archeological and genetic evidence. The Indo-Europeans have been identified with several cultural complexes existing in that area between 4,500—3,500 BCE. The literature supporting such a homeland is both extensive and persuasive [...]. Consequently, other scenarios regarding the possible Indo-European homeland, such as Anatolia, have now been mostly abandoned," although critical issues such as the way the proto-Greek, proto-Armenian, proto-Albanian, proto-Celtic, and proto-Anatolian languages became spoken in their attested homeland are still debated inside the steppe model.

The Anatolian hypothesis proposed by archeologist Colin Renfrew places the pre-PIE homeland in Anatolia around 8,000 BCE, and the homeland of Proto-Indo-European proper in the Balkans around 5,000 BCE, with waves of linguistic expansion following the progression of agriculture in Europe. Although it has attracted substantive attention and discussions, the datings it proposes are at odds with the linguistic timeframe for Proto-Indo-European and with genetic data, which do not find evidence for Anatolian origins in the Indian genepool. 

Apart from DNA evidence (see below), Anthony and Ringe (2015) give a number of arguments against the Anatolian hypothesis. First, cognate words for "axle", "wheel", "wagon-pole", and "convey by vehicle" can be found in a number of Indo-European languages ranging from Irish to Tocharian, but not Anatolian. This suggests that Proto-European speakers, after the split with Anatolian, had wheeled vehicles, which the neolithic farmers did not. For various reasons, such as the regular sound-changes which the words exhibit, the suggestion that the words might have spread later by borrowing or have been introduced by parallel innovation in the different branches of Indo-European can be ruled out. Secondly, the words borrowed at an early date by Proto-Uralic, as well as those borrowed from Caucasian languages, indicate a homeland geographically between the Caucasus and the Urals. Thirdly, if the Indo-European languages had spread westwards from Anatolia, it might be expected that Greek would be closest to Anatolian, whereas in fact it is much closer to Indo-Aryan. In addition, the culture described in early poems such as Homer's – praise of warriors, feasting, reciprocal guest-friendship, and so on – more closely match what is known of the burial practices of the steppe peoples than the neolithic farmers.

The most recent DNA findings from ancient bones as well as modern people show that farmers whose ancestors originated in Anatolia did indeed spread across Europe from 6,500 BCE onwards, eventually mixing with the existing hunter-gatherer population. However, about 2,500 BCE a massive influx of pastoralists from the steppe north of the Black Sea, associated with Corded Ware culture, spread from the east. Northern Europeans (especially Norwegians, Lithuanians, and Estonians) get nearly half their ancestry from this group; Spanish and Italians about a quarter, and Sardinians almost none. It is thought that this influx of pastoralists brought the Indo-European languages with them. Steppe ancestry is also found in the DNA of speakers of Indo-European languages in India, especially in the Y chromosome, which is inherited in the male line.

In general, the prestige associated with a specific language or dialect and its progressive dominance over others can be explained by the access to a natural resource unknown or unexploited until then by its speakers, which is thought to be horse-based pastoralism for Indo-European speakers rather than crop cultivation.

A notable third possibility, which has gained renewed attention since the 2010s, is the "Near Eastern model", also known as the Armenian hypothesis. It was proposed by linguists Tamaz V. Gamkrelidze and Vyacheslav Ivanov in the early 1980s, postulating connections between Indo-European and Caucasian languages based on the disputed glottalic theory and connected to archaeological findings by Grogoriev. Some recent DNA-research has led to renewed suggestions of the possibility of a Caucasian or Iranian homeland for archaic or 'proto-proto-Indo-European' (also called 'Indo-Anatolian' or 'Indo-Hittite' in the literature), the common ancestor of both Anatolian languages and early proto-IE (from which Tocharian and all other early branches split-off). These suggestions are disputed in other recent publications, which still locate the origin of the ancestor of proto-Indo-European in the Eastern European/Eurasian steppe or from a hybridization of both steppe and Northwest-Caucasian languages, while "[a]mong comparative linguists, a Balkan route for the introduction of Anatolian IE is generally considered more likely than a passage through the Caucasus, due, for example, to greater Anatolian IE presence and language diversity in the west."

Outlier theories 
A number of other theories have been proposed, most of which have little or no academic currency today (see discussion below):
 Modern nationalist doctrines:
Indigenous Aryans, which suggests a homeland in the Indian subcontinent in the 6th millennium BCE, and is favored by Hindu nationalists
Arctic theory, with a 6th millennium BCE or later origin in Northern Europe, according to Indian nationalist B. G. Tilak; and Lothar Kilian's and, especially, Marek Zvelebil's models of a broader homeland, which is favored by European and white ethnonationalists
 Paleolithic continuity theory, with an origin in the Upper Paleolithic
 Nikolai Trubetzkoy's theory of Sprachbund origin of Indo-European traits

Theoretical considerations
Traditionally homelands of linguistic families are proposed based on evidence from comparative linguistics coupled with evidence of historical populations and migrations from archaeology. Today, genetics via DNA samples is increasingly used in the study of ancient population movements.

Reconstructed vocabulary
Through comparative linguistics it is possible to reconstruct the vocabulary found in the proto-language, and in this way achieve knowledge of the cultural, technological and ecological context that the speakers inhabited. Such a context can then be compared with archaeological evidence. This vocabulary includes, in the case of (late) PIE, which is based on the post-Anatolian and post-Tocharian IE-languages:
 pastoralism, including domesticated cattle, horses, and dogs
 agriculture and cereal cultivation, including technology commonly ascribed to late-Neolithic farming communities, e.g., the plow
 a climate with winter snow
 transportation by or across water
 the solid wheel used for wagons, but not yet chariots with spoked wheels
Zsolt Simon notes that, although it can be useful to determine the period when the Proto-Indo-European language was spoken, using the reconstructed vocabulary to locate the homeland may be flawed, since we do not know whether Proto-Indo-European speakers knew a specific concept because it was part of their environment or because they had heard of it from other peoples they were interacting with.

Uralic, Caucasian and Semitic borrowings
Proto-Finno-Ugric and PIE have a lexicon in common, generally related to trade, such as words for "price" and "draw, lead". Similarly, "sell" and "wash" were borrowed in Proto-Ugric. Although some have proposed a common ancestor (the hypothetical Nostratic macrofamily), this is generally regarded as the result of intensive borrowing, which suggests that their homelands were located near each other. Proto-Indo-European also exhibits lexical loans to or from Caucasian languages, particularly Proto-Northwest Caucasian and Proto-Kartvelian, which suggests a location close to the Caucasus.

Gramkelidze and Ivanov, using the now largely unsupported glottalic theory of Indo-European phonology, also proposed Semitic borrowings into Proto-Indo-European, suggesting a more southern homeland to explain these borrowings. According to Mallory and Adams, some of these borrowings may be too speculative or from a later date, but they consider the proposed Semitic loans *táwros 'bull' and *wéyh₁on- 'wine; vine' to be more likely. Anthony notes that those Semitic borrowings may also have occurred through the advancement of Anatolian farmer cultures via the Danube valley into the steppe zone.

Genesis of Indo-European languages

Phases of Proto-Indo-European
According to Anthony, the following terminology may be used:
 Archaic PIE for "the last common ancestor of the Anatolian and non-Anatolian IE branches";
 Early, or Post-Anatolian, PIE for "the last common ancestor of the non-Anatolian PIE languages, including Tocharian";
 Late PIE for "the common ancestor of all other IE branches".

The Anatolian languages are the first Indo-European language family to have split off from the main group. Due to the archaic elements preserved in the Anatolian languages, they may be a "cousin" of Proto-Indo-European, instead of a "daughter", but Anatolian is generally regarded as an early offshoot of the Indo-European language group.

The Indo-Hittite hypothesis postulates a common predecessor for both the Anatolian languages and the other Indo-European languages, called Indo-Hittite or Indo-Anatolian. Although PIE had predecessors, the Indo-Hittite hypothesis is not widely accepted, and there is little to suggest that it is possible to reconstruct a proto-Indo-Hittite stage that differs substantially from what is already reconstructed for PIE.

Anthony (2019) suggests a derivation of the proto-Indo-European language mainly from a base of languages spoken by Eastern European Hunter-Gatherers living at the Volga steppes, with influences from languages spoken by northern Caucasus hunter-gatherers who migrated from the Caucasus to the lower Volga basin, in addition to a possible later and more minor influence from the language of the Maikop culture to the south (which is hypothesized to have belonged to the North Caucasian family) in the later Neolithic or Bronze Age involving little genetic impact.

Phylogenetic analyses
Lexico-statistical studies aimed at showing the relationship between the various branches of Indo-European languages began in the late 20th century with work by Dyen et al. (1992) and Ringe et al (2002). Subsequently a number of authors performed a Bayesian phylogenetic analysis of the IE languages (a mathematical method used in evolutionary biology to establish relationships between species). A secondary aim of these studies was to attempt to estimate the approximate dates at which the various branches separated from each other.

The earlier studies tended to estimate a relatively long time-frame for the development of the different branches. In particular the study by Bouckaert and colleagues (which included a geographical element) was "decisively" in favour of Anatolia as the geographical origin and supported Colin Renfrew's hypothesis that Indo-European spread from Anatolia along with agriculture from 7,500–6,000 BCE onwards. According to their analysis, the five major Indo-European subfamilies – Celtic, Germanic, Italic, Balto-Slavic and Indo-Iranian – all emerged as distinct lineages between 4000 and 2000 BCE. The authors pointed out that this time-scale is consistent with secondary movements such as the expansion of the steppe peoples after 3,000 BCE, which they suggest also played a role in the spread of Indo-European languages.

However, the more recent study by Chang, Cathcart, Hall, and Garrett (2015) came to a different conclusion. Their analysis differed from the earlier ones by using only languages which have a known historical ancestor such as Old English, Latin, Ancient Greek and Sanskrit, to take account of the fact that languages develop at different rates; they also included other methodological refinements to eliminate possible biasses of earlier studies. The results support a rather shorter timescale for the development of IE and are consistent with the Steppe hypothesis.

According to  Kassian et al. (2021), Hittite was the earliest language to split off from the rest, around 4,139–3,450 BCE, followed by Tocharian around 3,727–2,262 BCE. Subsequently Indo-European split into four branches ca. 3,357–2,162 BCE: (1) Greek-Armenian, (2) Albanian, (3) Italic-Germanic-Celtic, (4) Balto-Slavic–Indo-Iranian. Balto-Slavic split from Indo-Iranian around 2,723–1,790 BCE, Italic-Germanic-Celtic broke up around 2,655–1,537 BCE, and Indo-Iranian split up around 2,044–1,458 BCE. The position of Albanian, in fact, is not completely clear, from an insufficiency of evidence.

The authors point out that these dates, which are only approximate, are not inconsistent with the dates established by other methods for the various archaeological cultures which are thought to be associated with Indo-European languages. For example, the date for the Tocharian break-off corresponds to the migration that gave rise to the Afanasievo culture; the date for the Balto-Slavic–Indo-Iranian break-up may be correlated with the end of Corded Ware culture around 2,100 or 2,000 BCE; and the date for Indo-Iranian corresponds to that of the Sintashta archaeological culture, frequently associated with Proto-Indo-Iranian speakers.

Steppe hypothesis

The steppe hypothesis seeks to identify the source of the Indo-European language expansion as a succession of migrations from the Pontic–Caspian steppe between the 5th and 3rd millennia BCE. In the early 1980s, a mainstream consensus had emerged among Indo-Europeanists in favour of the "Kurgan hypothesis" (named after the kurgans, burial mounds, of the Eurasian steppes) placing the Indo-European homeland in the Pontic–Caspian steppe of the Chalcolithic.

Gimbutas' Kurgan hypothesis

According to the Kurgan hypothesis as formulated by Gimbutas, Indo-European speaking nomads from Eastern Ukraine and Southern Russia expanded on horseback in several waves during the 3rd millennium BCE, invading and subjugating supposedly peaceful European Neolithic farmers of Gimbutas' Old Europe. Later versions of Gimbutas' hypothesis put increasing emphasis on the patriarchal and patrilineal nature of the invading culture, in contrast with the apparently egalitarian and matrilineal culture of the invaded.

Archaeology
J. P. Mallory, dating the migrations to c. 4,000 BCE, and putting less insistence on their violent or quasi-military nature, essentially modified Gimbutas' theory making it compatible with a less gender-political narrative. David Anthony, focusing mostly on the evidence for the domestication of horses and the presence of wheeled vehicles, came to regard specifically the Yamna culture, which replaced the Sredny Stog culture around 3,500 BCE, as the most likely candidate for the Proto-Indo-European speech community.

Anthony describes the spread of cattle-raising from early farmers in the Danube Valley into the Ukrainian steppes in the 6th–5th millennium BCE, forming a cultural border with the hunter-gatherers whose languages may have included archaic PIE. Anthony notes that domesticated cattle and sheep probably didn't enter the steppes from the Transcaucasia, since the early farming communities there were not widespread, and separated from the steppes by the glaciated Caucasus. Subsequent cultures developed in this area which adopted cattle, most notably the Cucuteni-Trypillian culture.

Asko Parpola regards the Cucuteni-Trypillian culture as the birthplace of wheeled vehicles, and therefore as the homeland for Late PIE, assuming that Early PIE was spoken by Skelya pastoralists (early Sredny Stog culture) who took over the Tripillia culture at c. 4,300–4,000 BCE. On its eastern border lay the Sredny Stog culture (4400–3400 BCE), whose origins are related to "people from the east, perhaps from the Volga steppes". It plays a central role in Gimbutas' Kurgan hypothesis, and coincides with the spread of early PIE across the steppes and into the Danube valley (c. 4,000 BCE), leading to the collapse of Old Europe. Hereafter the Maykop culture suddenly arose, Tripillia towns grew strongly, and eastern steppe people migrated to the Altai mountains, founding the Afanasevo culture (3,300 to 2,500 BCE).

Vocabulary
The core element of the steppe hypothesis is the identification of the proto-Indo-European culture as a nomadic pastoralist society that did not practice intensive agriculture. This identification rests on the fact that vocabulary related to cows, to horses and horsemanship, and to wheeled vehicles can be reconstructed for all branches of the family, whereas only a few agricultural vocabulary items are reconstructable, suggesting a gradual adoption of agriculture through contact with non-Indo-Europeans. If this evidence and reasoning is accepted, the search for the Indo-European proto-culture has to involve searching for the earliest introduction of domesticated horses and wagons into Europe.

Responding to these arguments, proponents of the Anatolian hypothesis Russell Gray and Quentin Atkinson have argued that the different branches could have independently developed similar vocabulary based on the same roots, creating the false appearance of shared inheritance – or alternatively, that the words related to wheeled vehicle might have been borrowed across Europe at a later date. Proponents of the Steppe hypothesis have argued this to be highly unlikely, and to break with the established principles for reasonable assumptions when explaining linguistic comparative data.

Another source of evidence for the steppe hypothesis is the presence of what appears to be many shared loanwords between Uralic languages and proto-Indo-European, suggesting that these languages were spoken in adjacent areas. This would have had to take place a good deal further north than the Anatolian or Near Eastern scenarios would allow. According to Kortlandt, Indo-Uralic is the pre-PIE, postulating that Indo-European and Uralic share a common ancestor. According to Kortlandt, "Indo-European is a branch of Indo-Uralic which was radically transformed under the influence of a North Caucasian substratum when its speakers moved from the area north of the Caspian Sea to the area north of the Black Sea." Anthony notes that the validity of such deep relationships cannot be reliably demonstrated due to the time-depth involved, and also notes that the similarities may be explained by borrowings from PIE into proto-Uralic. Yet, Anthony also notes that the North Caucasian communities "were southern participants in the steppe world".

Kloekhorst argues that the Anatolian languages have preserved archaisms which are also found in proto-Uralic, providing strong evidence for a steppe-origin of PIE.

Human genetics

The subclade R1a1a (R-M17 or R-M198) is the R1a subclade most commonly associated with Indo-European speakers. In 2000, Ornella Semino et al. proposed a postglacial (Holocene) spread of the R1a1a haplogroup from north of the Black Sea during the time of the Late Glacial Maximum, which was subsequently magnified by the expansion of the Kurgan culture into Europe and eastward.

In 2015, a large-scale ancient DNA study by Haak et al. published in Nature found evidence of a "massive migration" from the Pontic-Caspian steppe to Central Europe that took place about 4,500 years ago. It found that individuals from the Central European Corded Ware culture (3rd millennium BCE) were genetically closely related to individuals from the Yamnaya culture. The authors concluded that their "results provide support for the theory of a steppe origin of at least some of the Indo-European languages of Europe".

Two other genetic studies in 2015 gave support to the steppe hypothesis regarding the Indo-European Urheimat. According to those studies, specific subclades of Y chromosome haplogroups R1b and R1a, which are found in Yamnaya and other proposed early Indo-European cultures such as Sredny Stog and Khvalynsk, and are now the most common in Europe (R1a is also common in South Asia) would have expanded from the Ukrainian and Russian steppes, along with the Indo-European languages; these studies also detected an autosomal component present in modern Europeans which was not present in Neolithic Europeans, which would have been introduced with paternal lineages R1b and R1a, as well as Indo-European languages.

However, the folk migration model cannot be the only diffusion theory for all linguistic families, as the Yamnaya ancestry component is particularly concentrated in Europe in the northwestern parts of the continent. Other models for languages like Proto-Greek are still debated. The steppe genetic component is more diffuse in studied Mycenaean populations: if they came from elsewhere, Proto-Greek speakers were certainly a minority in a sea of populations which had been familiar with agriculture for 4000 years. Some propose that they gained progressive prominence through a cultural expansion by elite influence. But if high correlations can be proven in ethnolinguistic or remote communities, genetics does not always equate with language, and archaeologists have argued that although such a migration might have taken place, it does not necessarily explain either the distribution of archaeological cultures or the spread of the Indo-European languages.

Russian archaeologist Leo Klejn (2017) noted that in the Yamnaya population, R1b-L23 is predominant, whereas Corded Ware males belong mostly to R1a, as well as far-removed R1b clades not found in Yamnaya. In his view, this does not support a Yamnaya origin for the Corded Ware culture. British archaeologist Barry Cunliffe describes this inconsistency as "disconcerting for the model as a whole". Klejn has also suggested that the autosomal evidence does not support a proposed Yamnaya migration, as Western Steppe Herder ancestry is lesser in the area from which the Yamnaya were proposed to have expanded, in both contemporary populations and Bronze Age specimens.

Furthermore, Balanovsy et al. (2017) found that the majority of the Yamnaya genomes studied by Haak and Mathieson belonged to the "eastern" R-GG400 subclade of R1b-L23, which is not common in western Europe, and none belonged to the "western" R1b-L51 branch. The authors conclude that the Yamnaya could not have been an important source of modern western European male haplogroups.

An analysis by David Anthony (2019) suggested a genetic origin of Proto-Indo-Europeans (associated with the Yamnaya culture) in the Eastern European steppe north of the Caucasus, deriving from a mixture of Eastern European hunter-gatherers (EHG) and hunter-gatherers from the Caucasus (CHG). Anthony also suggested that the Proto-Indo-European language formed mainly from a base of languages spoken by Eastern European hunter-gathers with influences from languages of northern Caucasus hunter-gatherers, in addition to a possible later and more minor influence from the language of the Maykop culture to the south (which is hypothesized to have belonged to the North Caucasian languages) in the later Neolithic or Bronze Age, involving little genetic impact.

In 2020, David Anthony offered a new hypothesis, with the aim of resolving the questions surrounding the apparent absence of haplogroup R1a in Yamnaya. He speculates that haplogroup R1a must have been present in the Yamnaya, but that it was initially extremely rare, and that the Corded Ware culture are the descendants of this wayward population that migrated north from the Pontic steppe and greatly expanded in size and influence, later returning to dominate the Pontic-Caspian steppe.

Anatolian hypothesis

Theory
The main competitor to the Kurgan hypothesis is the Anatolian hypothesis advanced by Colin Renfrew in 1987. It couples the spread of the Indo-European languages to the hard fact of the Neolithic spread of farming from the Near East, stating that the Indo-European languages began to spread peacefully into Europe from Asia Minor from around 7,000 BCE with the Neolithic advance of farming (wave of advance). The expansion of agriculture from the Middle East would have diffused three language families: Indo-European toward Europe, Dravidian toward Pakistan and India, and Afro-Asiatic toward Arabia and North Africa.

Around 6500 BC: Pre-Proto-Indo-European, located in Anatolia, splits into Anatolian and Archaic Proto-Indo-European, the language of those Pre-Proto-Indo-European farmers who migrate to Europe in the initial farming dispersal. Archaic Proto-Indo-European languages occur in the Balkans (Starčevo-Körös-Cris culture), in the Danube valley (Linear Pottery culture), and possibly in the Bug-Dniestr area (Eastern Linear pottery culture).
Around 5000 BC: Archaic Proto-Indo-European splits into Northwestern Indo-European (the ancestor of Italic, Celtic, and Germanic), located in the Danube valley, Balkan Proto-Indo-European (corresponding to Gimbutas' Old European culture), and Early Steppe Proto-Indo-European (the ancestor of Tocharian).

Reacting to criticism, Renfrew revised his proposal to the effect of taking a pronounced Indo-Hittite position. Renfrew's revised views place only Pre-Proto-Indo-European in 7th millennium BCE Anatolia, proposing as the homeland of Proto-Indo-European proper the Balkans around 5,000 BCE, explicitly identified as the "Old European culture" proposed by Marija Gimbutas. He thus still situates the original source of the Indo-European language family in Anatolia c. 7,000 BCE. Reconstructions of a Bronze Age PIE society based on vocabulary items like "wheel" do not necessarily hold for the Anatolian branch, which appears to have separated from PIE at an early stage, prior to the invention of wheeled vehicles.

Following the publication of several studies on ancient DNA in 2015, Colin Renfrew has accepted the reality of migrations of populations speaking one or several Indo-European languages from the Pontic steppe towards Northwestern Europe.

Objections

Dating
The main objection to this theory is that it requires an unrealistically early date. According to linguistic analysis, the Proto-Indo-European lexicon seems to include words for a range of inventions and practices related to the Secondary Products Revolution, which post-dates the early spread of farming. On lexico-cultural dating, Proto-Indo-European cannot be earlier than 4000 BCE. Furthermore, it has been objected, on impressionistic grounds, that it seems unlikely that close equivalences such as Hittite [eːsmi, eːsi, eːst͜si] = Sanskrit [ásmi, ási, ásti] ("I am, you are, he is") could have survived over such a long timescale as the Anatolian hypothesis requires.

Farming
The idea that farming was spread from Anatolia in a single wave has been revised. Instead it appears to have spread in several waves by several routes, primarily from the Levant. The trail of plant domesticates indicates an initial foray from the Levant by sea. The overland route via Anatolia seems to have been most significant in spreading farming into south-east Europe.

According to Lazaridis et al. (2016), farming developed independently both in the Levant and in the eastern Fertile Crescent. After this initial development, the two regions and the Caucasus interacted, and the chalcolithic north-west Iranian population appears to be a mixture of Iranian Neolithic, Levant, and Caucasus hunter-gatherers. According to Lazaridis et al. (2016), "farmers related to those from Iran spread northward into the Eurasian steppe; and people related to both the early farmers of Iran and to the pastoralists of the Eurasian steppe spread eastward into South Asia". They further note that ANI (Ancestral North Indian) "can be modelled as a mix of ancestry related to both early farmers of western Iran and to people of the Bronze Age Eurasian steppe", which makes it unlikely that the Indo-European languages in India are derived from Anatolia.

Alignment with the steppe theory
According to Alberto Piazza "[i]t is clear that, genetically speaking, peoples of the Kurgan steppe descended at least in part from people of the Middle Eastern Neolithic who immigrated there from Anatolia." According to Piazza and Cavalli-Sforza, the Yamna culture may have been derived from Middle Eastern Neolithic farmers who migrated to the Pontic steppe and developed pastoral nomadism:

Wells agrees with Cavalli-Sforza that there is "some genetic evidence for migration from the Middle East":

Southern archaic PIE-homeland hypothesis
Varying ideas have been proposed regarding the location of archaic PIE, including the Eurasian/Eastern European steppe, the Caucasus to the south, or a mixed origin derived from both regions.

Armenian hypothesis

Gamkrelidze and Ivanov held that the Urheimat was south of the Caucasus, specifically, "within eastern Anatolia, the southern Caucasus and northern Mesopotamia" in the 5th to 4th millennia BCE. Their proposal was based on a disputed theory of glottal consonants in PIE. According to Gamkrelidze and Ivanov, PIE words for material culture objects imply contact with more advanced peoples to the south, the existence of Semitic loan-words in PIE, Kartvelian (Georgian) borrowings from PIE, some contact with Sumerian, Elamite and others. However, given that the glottalic theory never caught on and there was little archaeological support, the Gamkrelidze and Ivanov theory did not gain support until Renfrew's Anatolian theory revived aspects of their proposal.

Gamkrelidze and Ivanov proposed that the Greeks moved west across Anatolia to their present location, a northward movement of some IE speakers that brought them into contact with the Finno-Ugric languages, and suggested that the Kurgan area, or better "Black Sea and Volga steppe", was a secondary homeland from which the western IE languages emerged.

South Caucasus/Iranian suggestions 
Recent DNA research which shows that the steppe-people derived from a mix of Eastern Hunter-Gatherers (EHG) and Caucasus Hunter-Gatherers, has led to renewed suggestions of the possibility of a Caucasian, or even Iranian, homeland for an archaic proto-Indo-European, the common ancestor of both Anatolian languages and all other Indo-European languages. It is argued that this may lend support to the Indo-Hittite hypothesis, according to which both proto-Anatolian and proto-Indo-European split-off from a common mother language "no later than the 4th millennium BCE."

Damgaard et al. found that sampled Copper Age and Bronze Age Anatolians all carried similar levels of CHG ancestry, but no EHG ancestry. They conclude that Early and Middle Bronze Age Anatolia did not receive ancestry from steppe populations, indicating that Indo-European language spread into Anatolia was not associated with large migrations from the steppe. The authors assert that their data is consistent with a scenario in which Indo-European languages were introduced to Anatolia in association with CHG admixture before c. 3,700 BCE, in contrast to the standard steppe model, and despite the association of CHG ancestry with several non-Indo-European languages. A second possibility, that Indo-European languages came to Anatolia along with small scale population movements and commerce, is also described as consistent with the data. They note that "Among comparative linguists, a Balkan route for the introduction of Anatolian IE is generally considered more likely than a passage through the Caucasus, due, for example, to greater Anatolian IE presence and language diversity in the west."

According to Wang et al. (2019), the typical steppe-ancestry, as an even mix between EHG and CHG, may result from "an existing natural genetic gradient running from EHG far to the north to CHG/Iran in the south," or it may be explained as "the result of Iranian/CHG-related ancestry reaching the steppe zone independently and prior to a stream of AF [Anatolian Farmer] ancestry." Wang et al. argue that evidence for gene flow to the steppe allows for a possible Indo-European homeland south of the Caucasus mountains. According to this model, Indo-European languages could have been brought north together with CHG ancestry, a scenario which could also explain the early split of Anatolian. They note that "the spread of some or all of the PIE branches would have been possible via the North Pontic/Caucasus region and from there, along with pastoralist expansions, to the heart of Europe."

Lazaridis et al. (2022) state that the genetic evidence is consistent with an origin of Proto-Indo-European either in the EHGs of the steppe, or in the south (the southern arc), but argue that their evidence points to the latter. They argue that genetic evidence from the 'Southern Arc', an area which includes Anatolia, North Mesopotamia, Western Iran, Armenia, Azerbaijan, and the Caucasus, allows the possibility of a West Asian homeland for the Proto-Indo-European language. In this view, Proto-Indo-European emerged in the southern arc, and was brought to Anatolia when Caucasus/Levantine-related ancestry flowed into Anatolia after the Neolithic, separating the Proto-Anatolian language from the rest of the Indo-European languages. Subsequent migrations from the southern arc brought Proto-Indo-European to the steppes. According to Lazaridis et al., the spread of all other (non-Anatolian) ancient Indo-European languages is associated with the migrations of Yamnaya pastoralists or genetically-related populations. The study argues that Anatolian languages cannot be linked to steppe migrations due to the absence of EHG ancestry in ancient Anatolians, despite what the study describes as extensive sampling, including  possible entry points into Anatolia by land or sea. The authors caution that they cannot yet identify the ultimate sources of population movements from the Southern Arc without further sampling of the possible source populations.

Bomhard's hybrid North Caspian/Caucasian hypothesis
Bomhard's Caucasian substrate hypothesis (2017, 2019) proposes an origin (Urheimat) in a Central Asian or North Caspian region of the steppe for Indo-Uralic (a proposed common ancestor of Indo-European and Uralic). Bomhard elaborates on Johanna Nichols "Sogdiana hypothesis", and Kortlandt's ideas of an Indo-Uralic proto-language, proposing an Urheimat north or east of the Caspian Sea, of a Eurasiatic language which was imposed on a population which spoke a Northwest Caucasian language, with this mixture producing proto-Indo-European.

Anthony: Steppe homeland with south Caspian CHG-influences
Indo-European specialist and anthropologist David Anthony (2019) criticizes the Southern/Caucasian homeland hypothesis (including the suggestions of those such as Reich, Kristiansen, and Wang). Instead, Anthony argues that the roots of the proto-Indo-European language formed mainly from a base of languages spoken by Eastern European hunter-gatherers, with some influences from the languages of Caucasus hunter-gatherers. Anthony rejects the possibility that the Bronze Age Maykop people of the Caucasus were a southern source of language and genetics of Indo-European. Referring to Wang et al. (2019), he notes that the Anatolian Farmer component in the Yamnaya-ancestry came from European farmers, not from the Maykop, which had too much Anatolian farmer ancestry to be ancestral to the Yamnaya-population. Anthony also notes that the paternal lineages of the Yamnaya, which were rich in R1b, were related to those of earlier Eastern European hunter-gatherers, rather than those of southern or Caucasus peoples such as the Maykop. Anthony rejects the possibility that the Bronze Age Maykop people of the Caucasus were a southern source of language and genetics of Indo-European. According to Anthony, referring to Wang et al. (2019), the Maykop culture had little genetic impact on the Yamnaya, whose paternal lineages were found to differ from those found in Maykop remains, but were instead related to those of earlier Eastern European hunter-gatherers. Also, the Maykop (and other contemporary Caucasus samples), along with CHG from this date, had significant Anatolian Farmer ancestry "which had spread into the Caucasus from the west after about 5000 BC", while the Yamnaya had a lower percentage which does not fit with a Maykop origin. Partly for these reasons, Anthony concludes that Bronze Age Caucasus groups such as the Maykop "played only a minor role, if any, in the formation of Yamnaya ancestry." According to Anthony, the roots of Proto-Indo-European (archaic or proto-proto-Indo-European) were mainly in the steppe rather than the south. Anthony considers it likely that the Maykop spoke a Northern Caucasian language not ancestral to Indo-European.

Anthony proposes that the Yamnaya derived mainly from Eastern European hunter-gatherers (EHG) from the steppes, and undiluted Caucasus hunter-gatherers (CHG) from northwestern Iran or Azerbaijan, similar to the Hotu cave population, who mixed in the Eastern European steppe north of the Caucasus. According to Anthony, hunting-fishing camps from the lower Volga, dated 6200–4500 BCE, could be the remains of people who contributed the CHG-component, migrating westwards along the coast of the Caspian Sea, from an area south-east of the Caspian Sea. They mixed with EHG-people from the north Volga steppes, and the resulting culture contributed to the Sredny Stog culture, a predecessor of the Yamnaya culture.

Other hypotheses

Baltic homeland 

Lothar Kilian and Marek Zvelebil have proposed a 6th millennium BCE or later origin of the IE-languages in Northern Europe, as a creolisation of migrating Neolithic farmers settling in northern Europe, and mixing with indigenous Mesolithic hunter-gatherer communities. The steppe theory is compatible with the argument that the PIE homeland must have been larger, because the "Neolithic creolisation hypothesis" allows the Pontic-Caspian region to have been part of PIE territory.

Palaeolithic continuity theory 

The Paleolithic continuity theory or paradigm is a hypothesis suggesting that the Proto-Indo-European language (PIE) can be traced back to the Upper Paleolithic, several millennia earlier than the Chalcolithic or at the most Neolithic estimates in other scenarios of Proto-Indo-European origins. Its main proponents are Marcel Otte, Alexander Häusler, and Mario Alinei.

The PCT or PCP posits that the advent of Indo-European languages should be linked to the arrival of Homo sapiens in Europe and western Asia from Africa in the Upper Paleolithic. Employing "lexical periodization", Alinei arrives at a timeline deeper than even that of Colin Renfrew's Anatolian hypothesis.

Since 2004, an informal workgroup of scholars who support the Paleolithic continuity hypothesis has been held online. Apart from Alinei himself, its leading members (referred to as "Scientific Committee" in the website) are linguists Xaverio Ballester (University of Valencia) and Francesco Benozzo (University of Bologna). Also included are prehistorian Marcel Otte (Université de Liège) and anthropologist Henry Harpending (University of Utah).

It was not listed by Mallory in 1997 among the proposals for the origins of the Indo-European languages that are widely discussed and considered credible within academia.

Fringe theories

Hyperborea

Soviet Indologist Natalia R. Guseva and Soviet ethnographer S. V. Zharnikova, influenced by Bal Gangadhar Tilak's 1903 work The Arctic Home in the Vedas, argued for a northern Urals Arctic homeland of the Indo-Aryan and Slavic people; their ideas were popularized by Russian nationalists.

Out of India theory 

The Indigenous Aryans theory, also known as the "out of India" theory, proposes an Indian origin for the Indo-European languages. The languages of northern India and Pakistan, including Hindi and the historically and culturally significant liturgical language Sanskrit, belong to the Indo-Aryan branch of the Indo-European language family. The Steppe model, rhetorically presented as an "Aryan invasion," has been opposed by Hindu revivalists and Hindu nationalists, who argue that the Aryans were indigenous to India, and some, such as B. B. Lal, Koenraad Elst and Shrikant Talageri, have proposed that Proto-Indo-European itself originated in northern India, either with or shortly before the Indus Valley civilisation. This "out of India" theory is not regarded as plausible in mainstream scholarship.

See also

 Bronze Age Europe
 Indo-European studies
 Neolithic Europe
 Old European culture
 Proto-Indo-Europeans
 Indo-European migrations

Notes

Subnotes

References

Sources
Printed sources

 
 
 

 

 
 
 

 
 Chang, Will; Cathcart, Chundra; Hall, David; Garrett, Andrew (2015). "Ancestry-Constrained Phylogenetic Analysis Supports the Indo-European Steppe Hypothesis". Language, 91, Number 1, March 2015: 194–244.

 

 
 

 

 Kassian, Alexei S., Mikhail Zhivlov, George Starostin, Artem A. Trofimov, Petr A. Kocharov, Anna Kuritsyna and Mikhail N. Saenko (2021). "Rapid radiation of the inner Indo-European languages: an advanced approach to Indo-European lexicostatistics". Linguistics, Volume 59 Issue 4.
 
 
 

 
 

 

 
 
 .

Further reading

 
 
Haarmann, Harald. Auf Den Spuren Der Indoeuropäer: Von Den Neolithischen Steppennomaden Bis Zu Den Frühen Hochkulturen. München: Verlag C.H.Beck, 2016. doi:10.2307/j.ctv1168qhx.
Heggarty, Paul. "Prehistory by Bayesian phylogenetics? The state of the art on Indo-European origins." Antiquity 88.340 (2014): 566-577.
 
 
 Kroonen, G; Jakob, A; Palmér, AI; van Sluis, P; Wigman, A (2022). "Indo-European cereal terminology suggests a Northwest Pontic homeland for the core Indo-European languages". In: PLoS ONE 17(10): e0275744. https://doi.org/10.1371/journal.pone.0275744
 
 
 
Rowlett, Ralph M. "Research Directions in Early Indo-European Archaeology." (1990): 415-418.

External links

 Formation of the Indo-European Branches in the light of the Archaeogenetic Revolution, John Koch (2018)

Urheimat
Indo-European
Proto-Indo-Europeans
Homeland
Urheimat